Heteragrion tricellulare is a species of damselfly in the family Heteragrionidae. It is found in Guatemala and Mexico. Its natural habitats are subtropical or tropical moist montane forests and rivers. It is threatened by habitat loss.

References

Insects described in 1901
Taxonomy articles created by Polbot